Heinz Wossipiwo (born 25 January 1951) is a German former ski jumper who competed from 1971 to 1975, representing East Germany.

Career
He won a silver medal in the individual large hill at the 1974 FIS Nordic World Ski Championships in Falun. Wossipiwo also won a silver medal at the 1972 Ski-flying World Championships. 

He also finished second one other time in his career in a normal hill event at Oberstdorf, West Germany in 1973. He also competed at the 1972 Winter Olympics.

On 9 March 1973, he set a world record distance at 169 metres (554 ft) on Heini-Klopfer-Skiflugschanze in Oberstdorf, West Germany.

Ski jumping world record

References

External links
 

1951 births
Living people
People from Bad Elster
German male ski jumpers
Sportspeople from Saxony
FIS Nordic World Ski Championships medalists in ski jumping
Olympic ski jumpers of East Germany
Ski jumpers at the 1972 Winter Olympics